A Romance may refer to:
 Middle Age: A Romance, a bestselling 2001 novel
 Possession: A Romance, a 1990 bestselling novel
 The Abbess: A Romance, a gothic novel by William Henry Ireland
 The Scarlet Letter: A Romance, an American novel

See also
 Romance (disambiguation)